Duque de Caxias Futebol Clube, usually known simply as Duque de Caxias, is a Brazilian football team from the city of Duque de Caxias, Rio de Janeiro state. It currently plays in the Campeonato Carioca Série B1, the second tier of the Rio de Janeiro state league. 

The club was founded on March 8, 2005.

History
Tamoio Futebol Clube was founded on February 22, 1957, in Xerém, a district of Duque de Caxias, by local sportsmen.

On March 8, 2005, the mayor of Duque de Caxias, Washington Reis, refounded Tamoio Futebol Clube as Duque de Caxias Futebol Clube, with the purpose of increasing the club's visibility.

In 2008, Duque de Caxias finished in the 4th place in that season's Campeonato Brasileiro Série C, thus being promoted to the 2009 Campeonato Brasileiro Série B.

Achievements

 BTV Cup :
 Winners (1): 2009 

 Copa Rio:
 Winners (1): 2013

Current squad

Stadium

Duque de Caxias plays its home games at Estádio Romário de Souza Faria, also known as Marrentão, which has a maximum capacity of 7,000 people. Marrentão replaced Estádio Mestre Telê Santana, also known as Maracanãzinho, as the club 's home ground.

Colors
The official colors are orange, blue and white.

References

External links
—[www.souduque.com.br/ Official Duque de Caxias Futebol Clube website]

 
Duque de Caxias, Rio de Janeiro
Football clubs in Rio de Janeiro (state)
1957 establishments in Brazil
Association football clubs established in 1957